The Ukrainian men's national field hockey team represents Ukraine in international field hockey competitions.

Tournament history
Ukraine has never participated in or qualified for the World Cup, the Summer Olympics and the EuroHockey Nations Championship.

European championships

EuroHockey Championship II
2007 – 8th place
2011 – 5th place
2013 – 5th place
2015 – 6th place
2017 – 5th place
2019 – 6th place
2021 – 6th place

EuroHockey Championship III
2005 – 
2009 –

Hockey World League
2012–13 – 21st place
2014–15 – 24th place
2016–17 – 35th place

FIH Hockey Series
2018–19 – Second round

See also
Ukraine women's national field hockey team

References

European men's national field hockey teams
Field hockey
National team